Lathyrus polyphyllus is a species of wild pea known by the common name leafy pea. It is native to the western United States from Washington to northern California, where it grows in forest and other habitat. This is a perennial herb with long leaves each made up of many pairs of oval-shaped leaflets a few centimeters long. The leaf also has tendrils which may be long, branched and coiled, or just a short bristle. The stipules are large as well, often over a centimeter wide. The plant produces an inflorescence of up to 12 pea flowers usually arranged in a line along one side of the stem. The flowers are up to 2 centimeters wide and are a variety of shades of purple. The fruit is a dehiscent legume pod containing peas.

External links

Jepson Manual Treatment
USDA Plants Profile
Photo gallery

polyphyllus
Flora of California
Flora of Oregon
Flora of Washington (state)
Flora of the Klamath Mountains
Flora without expected TNC conservation status